Newman Ivey White (February 3, 1892 – December 6, 1948) was an American professor of English at Duke University. He was born in Statesville, North Carolina, United States. He was a noted Shelley scholar, as well as a collector of American folklore, including folk songs and Duke limericks. He served as Professor of English at Trinity College and Duke University from 1919 to 1948. He wrote American Negro Folk Songs (1928) and in it he quoted a work song, sung by laborers in Augusta, Georgia, which mentioned the notorious Judge Fogarty. White also recalled hearing a version in Statesville, North Carolina in 1903.

A professorship at Duke has been named in his honor.

Publications
 An Anthology of Verse by American Negroes 1924
 American Negro Folk Songs 1928
  Shelley 1940
 Portrait of Shelley 1945

References

References
Preliminary Inventory of the Newman Ivey White Papers, University Archives, Duke University.
 

1892 births
1948 deaths
People from Statesville, North Carolina
American folklorists
Duke University Trinity College of Arts and Sciences alumni
Duke University faculty
Harvard University alumni
American academics of English literature